WBZH (910 AM) is a radio station licensed to serve Hayward, Wisconsin, United States. Established in 1957 as WHSM, the station is owned by Civic Media.

The station was originally assigned the WHSM call sign by the Federal Communications Commission. Its studios and transmitter are located on W. Highway 63, west of downtown Hayward.

On July 20, 2016, Red Rock Radio announced that it would sell WHSM to Zoe Communications as part of a five-station deal; the sale was completed on September 30, 2016. In February 2017, WHSM changed their format from soft oldies to adult contemporary, branded as "96.9 The Cabin" (simulcast on FM translator W245CT 96.9 FM Hayward). The call sign was subsequently changed to WCBN on May 6, 2017.

As of October 2020, WCBN and W245CT are broadcasting a Classic Hits format.

The station changed its call sign to WBZH on October 1, 2022.

In November 2022 WBZH went silent and its "96.9 The Cabin" classic hits format moved to the HD2 subchannel of WHSM-FM 101.1 Hayward.

References

External links

BZH
Sawyer County, Wisconsin
Radio stations established in 1958
1958 establishments in Wisconsin